Jim Broockmann (born 6 May 1936) is  a former Australian rules footballer who played with Fitzroy in the Victorian Football League (VFL).

Notes

External links 		
		
		
		
		
		
		
Living people		
1936 births		
		
Australian rules footballers from New South Wales		
Fitzroy Football Club players
Finley Football Club players